Postal codes in Denmark are determined by a four digit system that was introduced in 1967. The only exceptions are five special purpose 3-digit codes. The self-governing territory of Greenland is part of the Danish system (39xx). Historically, the Faroe Islands also formed part of the Danish postal code system using the 38xx range and the prefix "FR", but this was changed to a new format consisting of a three-digit code and the country code "FO", with FR 3800 Tórshavn becoming FO-110 Tórshavn.  

New regulations add the country code DK to the postal codes, but in practice it is most often omitted.

The code is written before the city name.

Examples:
1000 København C (Copenhagen City)
6100 Haderslev
DK-9000 Aalborg

Ministry of Foreign Affairs of Denmark
Asiatisk Plads 2
DK-1448 Copenhagen K

or in Danish

Udenrigsministeriet
Asiatisk Plads 2
1448 København K - not necessarily with the DK - Be aware that the DK or Denmark must be used when mailed from abroad.

The postal codes follow a geographic pattern and most Danes can tell which region an address belongs to based on the postal code alone.

See also
 List of postal codes in Denmark

References

Denmark
Postal system of Denmark
Philately of Denmark